Hassing is a Danish  and German language habitational surname. Notable people with the name include:
 Anne Louise Hassing (1967), Danish actress
 Carsten Hassing (1967), Danish rower

German-language surnames
German toponymic surnames
Danish-language surnames
Danish toponymic surnames